The theme for the 1964 TV series The Addams Family was written and arranged by longtime Hollywood film and television composer Vic Mizzy. The song's arrangement was dominated by a harpsichord, and featured finger-snaps as percussive accompaniment. Actor Ted Cassidy, reprising his "Lurch" voice, punctuated the lyrics with the words "neat", "sweet", and "petite". Mizzy's theme was popular enough to enjoy a single release, though it failed to make the national charts.

The closing theme was similar, but was instrumental only and featured such instruments as a triangle, a wooden block, a siren whistle, and a duck call.

See also 
 Addams Groove - a single performed by hip-hop artist Hammer that was released as the theme song to the 1991 film The Addams Family.
 Black No. 1 (Little Miss Scare-All) - a single by goth metal band Type O Negative that includes a short reference of the theme.

Legacy
The song has become popular as a staple of the Addams Family. It is referenced in other media prominently, especially in the 2022 series Wednesday. In the series, the code to enter the sanctum of the secret society of the Nightshades is to snap twice (similar to how snapping twice is part of the song).

References

External links 
  from the original television series.
 
 Vic Mizzy, His Orchestra And Chorus - Discography at 45cat.com
 

Comedy television theme songs
The Addams Family music
Halloween songs
Film theme songs
1964 songs
Songs about fictional characters
Songs about families